Central Fire Station is a historic fire station located at Greensboro, Guilford County, North Carolina. It was designed by architect Charles C. Hartmann and built in 1925–1926.  It is a two-story, red brick building with carved granite ornamentation in the Renaissance Revival building. It is nine bays wide and has a six bay wide stepped and projecting pavilion with flattened arches and attached granite columns.  The building once had a six-story tower, removed in the early-1950s.

It was listed on the National Register of Historic Places in 1980.

References

Fire stations on the National Register of Historic Places in North Carolina
Renaissance Revival architecture in North Carolina
Fire stations completed in 1926
Buildings and structures in Greensboro, North Carolina
National Register of Historic Places in Guilford County, North Carolina
1926 establishments in North Carolina